Blue Spur is a locality inland from Hokitika in the Westland District of New Zealand.

Description
Blue Spur stretches from the Tasman Sea in the west about  eastwards towards the area of Humphreys and the Blue Spur Range. It can be accessed by road along the "Blue Spur Tourist Drive" from the centre of Hokitika. During the late 1860s, the time of the West Coast Gold Rush, "The Spur" (as the locals always called it) was inhabited by more than 2,500 people. There was a school, several hotels, busy bars and a theatre. Since around the year 2000 the area is gradually being rediscovered and repopulated as it offers rural living close to town.

Name
The etymology of the term "blue spur" not well known. The gold diggers of the 1860s gold rush went after the gold "on the spur (of the moment)", i.e. in a great hurry/rush. Alluvial gold may often be found close to a layer of blueish clay. Miners frequently talk about mining down to the "blue clay", thus a "blue spur" could somehow elucidate the hasty process of digging for the gold pursuing a blueish layer of clay. Other potential meanings could refer to a blueish colour of mountains ("blue mountains") as it can be spotted in certain light at distant mountains at this location, combined with the geological meaning of a spur, i.e., a secondary mountain ridge. Besides these gold rush-related connotations there is a "blue spur flower" (Plectranthus ciliatus), and the "blue spur" in coats of arms.

References

Westland District
West Coast Gold Rush
Populated places in the West Coast, New Zealand